Bonnie & Clyde Copycats is a 2017 Belgian action film written and directed by Bo & Gustavo Catilina.

Plot 
Bruges is threatened by two notorious mob gangs: the ruthful Alfredo's gang and the Toriettis, who have more values.

Betty and Marc are an average couple who hate their jobs and dress up as Bonnie & Clyde to try and have a little fun. When they accidentally witness Alfredo, killing a key figure in the Torrieti family, they get entangled in their gang war.

Production 
Bonnie & Clyde Copycats was filmed at the same time as Direction Lourdes in the summer of 2014, for a total budget of €0.

Location 
The entire film was shot on location in and around Bruges. The climax was filmed at the international airport of Ostend-Bruges.

References

External links 
 
 

2017 films
2010s road movies
Belgian action films
2010s English-language films